The 1997 British Lions tour to South Africa was a series of matches played by the British Lions rugby union team in South Africa. This tour followed the Lions' 1993 tour to New Zealand and preceded their 2001 tour to Australia. The much-anticipated tour was the first after the end of apartheid in South Africa, and the first Lions tour since rugby union turned professional. It was only the third time that a touring side had won a test series in South Africa; the others being the 1974 Lions and the 1996 All Blacks.

A documentary Living with Lions was produced and contains footage of players and coaching staff during and away from matches.

Pre-tour prospects
South Africa had won the 1995 Rugby World Cup, but were in decline at the time of the tour. The inaugural Tri Nations in 1996 had been comfortably won by New Zealand with South Africa winning only one of their four matches in the tournament. There was also some disarray in the management of the game in South Africa with the resignation of the coach Andre Markgraaff and the acrimonious replacement of the World Cup-winning captain Francois Pienaar. Nevertheless, the Lions were seen to be underdogs – for example an editorial in the South African sports magazine "SA Sports Illustrated" said "The British Lions arrived in South Africa rated – by their own media, South African media and supporters – as nothing more than rank underdogs. A nice bunch of blokes who were making a bit of history and, in so doing, winning friends rather than matches".

The results
The Lions won the first test at Newlands 25–16 with Neil Jenkins kicking five penalties, and Matt Dawson and Alan Tait scoring tries. Despite scoring three tries in the second test at Durban, the Springboks suffered from some woeful goalkicking and failed to land any penalties or conversions, while the Lions Neil Jenkins once again kicked five penalties to level the scores at 15–15 before a Jerry Guscott drop goal for an 18–15 lead for the Lions. The Lions then held off a ferocious South African fightback, Lawrence Dallaglio putting in a magnificent try-saving tackle, to win the match 18–15 and take the series. The third test at Ellis Park proved a match too far for the Lions squad and they lost 35–16.

The tour was a triumph for the Lions management of Fran Cotton (manager), Ian McGeechan (head coach), Jim Telfer (assistant coach) and especially the Captain Martin Johnson. It was the last occasion on which the Lions returned victorious from a tour until the victorious tour of Australia in 2013.

Lions squad
The original 35-man squad was:

Matches
Scores and results list British Lions' points tally first.

First Test

Second Test

Third Test

References

British Lions In South Africa
1997
1997 in South African rugby union
1996–97 in Irish rugby union
1996–97 in English rugby union
1996–97 in Scottish rugby union
1996–97 in Welsh rugby union
1996–97 in British rugby union